Diving equipment is equipment used by underwater divers to make diving activities possible, easier, safer and/or more comfortable. This may be equipment primarily intended for this purpose, or equipment intended for other purposes which is found to be suitable for diving use.

The fundamental item of diving equipment used by divers other than freedivers, is underwater breathing apparatus, such as scuba equipment, and surface-supplied diving equipment, but there are other important items of equipment that make diving safer, more convenient or more efficient. Diving equipment used by recreational scuba divers, also known as scuba gear, is mostly personal equipment carried by the diver, but professional divers, particularly when operating in the surface supplied or saturation mode, use a large amount of support equipment not carried by the diver.

Equipment which is used for underwater work or other activities which is not directly related to the activity of diving, or which has not been designed or modified specifically for underwater use by divers is not considered to be diving equipment.

Classes of underwater breathing apparatus
The diving mode is largely defined by the type of breathing apparatus used.
 Surface supplied diving - mostly used in professional diving. This category includes:
 Surface oriented surface supplied diving (Bounce diving), where the diver starts and finishes the dive at normal atmospheric pressure.
 Saturation diving, where the diver remains under pressure in an underwater habitat or saturation spread between underwater excursions.
 Standard diving dress - mostly used in professional diving. Mainly of historical interest now.
 Airline or Hookah diving.
 "Compressor diving" - a rudimentary form of surface supplied diving used in the Philippines by artisanal fishermen.
 Recreational forms like snuba.
Scuba diving - The use of self-contained underwater breathing apparatus. This category includes:
 Open-circuit scuba consisting of diving cylinder(s) and diving regulator(s)
 Rebreather diving, closed-circuit or semi-closed-circuit scuba
 Free diving or breathhold diving, where the diver completes the dive on a single breath of air taken at the surface before the dive.
 Snorkel allows breathing at the surface with the face submerged, and is used as an adjunct to free diving and scuba.
 Atmospheric diving suits and other submersibles which isolate the diver from the ambient environment. These are not considered here.
 Liquid breathing systems are still hypothetical and at an early experimental stage. It is hoped that some day practical systems will allow very deep diving. This is not considered here.

Personal diving equipment
This is the diving equipment worn by or carried by the diver for personal protection or comfort, or to facilitate the diving aspect of the activity, and may include a selection from:

Underwater breathing apparatus

 Scuba equipment: Primary cylinder(s), carried back-mounted or side mounted and open circuit regulator(s), or rebreather sets. Alternative air source such as bailout bottle or pony bottle, and decompression cylinders and their associated regulators. Secondary demand valve (Octopus).
 Surface supplied equipment: Helmet or full face mask, diver's umbilical, airline, bailout block, bailout cylinder and regulator.

Environmental protection 

The underwater environment usually requires a diver to wear thermal, sting and abrasion protection.
 In cold water, a diving suit such as a dry suit (at temperatures of 0-10 °C), a wet suit (at temperatures of 21-25 °C), or a Hot water suit (surface supplied diving only) is necessary.
 Boiler suit overalls are often worn over the thermal protection suit by commercial divers as abrasion protection for the more easily damaged and expensive diving suit.
 In very warm water (temperatures of 26-30 °C), many types of tough, long, everyday clothing provide protection, as well as purpose made garments such as dive skins (made of lycra) and shorty wetsuits. In some cases, simple regular swimsuits are also used.
 Diving gloves, including wetsuit gloves and dry gloves, mitts, and three-finger mitts
 Diving hoods
 Diving boots - With dry suits, the boots are usually integrated.
 Safety helmet for scuba diving. (Not part of the breathing apparatus.) 
 Diving chain mail may be used as protection against bites by large marine animals
 Diver's cages may be used as protection against large predators
 Atmospheric diving suit provides complete isolation from the environment

In-water stabilisation and movement
This equipment includes buoyancy control equipment and mobility equipment:
Buoyancy control is achieved  by  ballasting with diving weights and compensating for buoyancy changes during the dive using a buoyancy compensator:
 Buoyancy compensator, also known as Buoyancy Control Device, BCD or BC - is usually a back mounted or sleeveless jacket style device which includes an inflatable bladder used to adjust the buoyancy of the diver under water, and provide positive buoyancy at the surface. The buoyancy compensator is usually an integral part of the harness system used to secure the scuba set to the diver. The earlier collar style buoyancy compensator is seldom used any more.
 Diving weighting system - to counteract the buoyancy of the diving suit and diver to allow descent. Professional divers may use additional weighting to ensure stability when working on the bottom

Mobility equipment allows the diver to move through the water and maneuver on the spot:
 Diver Propulsion Vehicle - to increase the range of the diver underwater
 Fins for efficient propulsion

Equipment for dive monitoring and navigation

These are the equipment used for monitoring the course of the dive and following the dive plan when undesirable events are avoided. They include planning and monitoring the dive profile, gas usage and decompression, navigation, and modifying the plan to suit actual circumstances. 
 Depth gauge lets the diver monitor depth, particularly maximum depth and, when used with a watch and Decompression tables, also allows the diver to monitor decompression requirements. Some digital depth gauges also indicate ascent rate which is an important factor in avoiding decompression sickness
 Pneumofathometer is the surface supplied diving depth gauge which displays the depth of the diver at the surface control panel. It uses hydrostatic back-pressure on a low flow rate open ended air hose to the diver to indicate depth.
 Diving watch is used with depth gauge for decompression monitoring when using decompression tables. Largely superseded by dive computers, where elapsed time is one of the standard displays, and time of day may also be available.
 Dive timer is an instrument that displays and records depth and elapsed time during the dive. It is usually possible to extract the information after the dive. This function is often available as "Gauge setting" on dive computers.
 Diving compass for underwater navigation. This may be a regular magnetic compass, but is often a selectable function of a dive computer, where a miniature magnetometer is used.
 Submersible pressure gauge, also known as a "contents gauge" is used to monitor the remaining breathing gas supply in scuba cylinders.
 Dive computer helps the diver to avoid decompression sickness by indicating the decompression stops needed for the dive profile. Most dive computers also indicate depth, time and ascent rate. Some also indicate oxygen toxicity exposure and water temperature, and may provide other functions. A display of cylinder pressure is available on air-integrated computers, either via a direct high pressure hose, or remotely via a pressure transducer and through-water transmission.
 Distance line, guide line, or "come-home-line" can be used to guide the diver back to the start point and safety in poor visibility.
 A cave line is a line laid by a diver while penetrating a cave to ensure that the way out is known. Permanent cave lines are marked with line markers at all junctions, indicating the direction along the line toward the nearest exit.

Vision and communication

Underwater vision is significantly affected by several factors. Objects are less visible because of lower levels of natural illumination and are blurred by scattering of light between the object and the viewer, also resulting in lower contrast. These effects vary with wavelength of the light, and color and turbidity of the water. The human eye is unable to focus when in direct contact with water, and an air space must be provided. Voice communication requires special equipment, and much recreational diver communication is visual and based on hand signals.
 Masks allow the diver to see clearly underwater and protect the eyes.
 Full face masks protect the face from dirty or cold water and increases safety by securing the gas supply to the diver's face. If it contains no mouthpiece, the diver can talk, allowing the use of communications equipment.
 Half masks cover only the eyes and nose. The diver breathes from a separate mouthpiece on the regulator or rebreather.
 Diving helmets are often used with surface supplied diving. They provide the same benefits as the full face mask but provide a very secure connection of the gas supply to the diver and additionally protect the head.
 Underwater writing slates and pencils are used to transport pre-dive plans underwater, to record facts whilst underwater and to aid communication with other divers.
 Dive lights, which are usually waterproof and pressure rated torches or flashlights, are essential for safety in low visibility or dark environments such as night diving and wreck and cave penetration. They are useful for communication and signalling both underwater and on the surface at night. Divers need artificial light even in shallow and clear water to reveal the red end of the spectrum of light which is absorbed as it travels through water. Underwater video lights can serve the same purpose.
 Hand-held sonar for a diver can provide a synthetic view using ultrasonic signals emitted and processed by an electronic device and displayed on a screen.
 Ultrasonic signalling devices which attract the buddies attention by vibration have been marketed and may have some limited utility.

Safety equipment

 Diver's safety harness, to which a lifeline may be attached, including Bell harness, AR vest, Jump jacket.
  (or tether): A line from the diver to a tender at the surface control point, which may be used for:
 communications, by diving line signals,
 to allow the diver to be found by the stand-by diver following the line,
 to provide a guideline to the surface control point to guide the diver on return,
 to assist the diver to maintain position in a current,
 in an emergency, to recover the diver to the surface, and
 in some cases lift the diver out of the water.
 Shotline: A line connecting a shot weight to a marker buoy, used to mark a dive site and provide a vertical reference for descent and ascent.
 Buddy line: A short line or strap connecting two divers in the water, used to prevent them from being separated in poor visibility and for communication by line signals.
 Jonline: A short line or webbing strap to tether the diver to the shotline in a current.
 Surface marker buoy, which indicates the position of the divers to people at the surface.
 DSMB - (Delayed, or deployable surface marker buoy), or decompression buoy which is inflated at the start of, or during the ascent, to indicate the position of the divers to the surface team, and as a signal that the divers are ascending.
 Cutting tool
 Knife to cut lines, nets or to pry or dig.  Not intended for personal protection against underwater predators as it is generally ineffective for this purpose.
 Diver's net or line cutter. This is a small handheld tool carried by scuba divers to extricate themselves if trapped in fishing net or fishing line. It has a small sharp blade such as a replaceable scalpel blade inside the small notch. There is a small hole at the other end for a lanyard to tether the cutter to the diver.
Trauma shears. Very effective as a line cutter, with low risk of inadvertent injury or damage. Usually carried in a pocket or special purpose sheath.
 Automatic diver recovery devices which inflate the BCD if the diver stops breathing have been marketed. They are not generally used and the risks may outweigh possible benefits.

Surface detection aids

The purposes of this class of personal equipment are to:
 allow the support boat to monitor and find divers on the surface during or after a dive
 prevent the diver being struck by boat traffic
 mark the diver's position when drift diving or while at the decompression stop
 help rescue services in lifeboats and helicopters to locate the diver

Surface detection aids include:
 Surface marker buoy, decompression buoy, delayed SMB, safety sausage or blob
 Red or yellow collapsible flag - high visibility, robust, usually stored bungeed to cylinder
 Whistle - cheap, will only be heard by people far from engine noise
 Torch or flashlight - if at sea after nightfall
 Strobe light - needs long-lasting batteries
 High pressure whistle - expensive but effective
 Orange dye marker - increases diver's visibility from search helicopters
 Mirror such as a used compact disc - to reflect sunlight or searchlights
 Red pyrotechnic flares - for helicopters and lifeboats
 ENOS Rescue-System
 Emergency position-indicating rescue beacon (EPIRB)
 Emergency locator beacon - A transmitter carried by the diver that can send a GPS position by VHF radio and/or Automatic identification system (AIS)
 Glow stick - for night diving

Personal tools and accessories

 Camera, strobe (flash), video lights and housing - for underwater photography or underwater videography
 Diving reel, spool or line holder to store and transport a distance line or line for a surface marker buoy. A spool is a small flanged cylinder with an axial hole, around which a length of line can be wound, and a line holder is a flat H-shaped piece of rigid sheet material on which a length of line can be wound, as an alternative to a reel or spool. The line may be used with a surface marker buoy or a delayed surface marker buoy, where negative buoyancy of the spool or line holder will help with unwinding the line underwater.
 Dry box to hold objects the diver needs to keep dry at depth (wallet, cell phone)
 Dry bag to carry items that must stay dry on the boat.
 Dive bag to hold equipment for travel.
 Tool bag to carry tools that may be required for the job. Various types and sizes are available.
 A rescue tether, or rescue rope, is a short lanyard or strap carried by a surface supplied stand-by diver to be used to tether an unresponsive diver to the standby diver during a rescue. It is attached at one end to a D-ring on the stand-by diver's harness, and has a clip at the other end which may be secured to a D-ring on the casualty's harness to allow the rescuer the use of both hands during the return to the bell or surface.

Diving team tools and equipment

 A jackstay is a form of guideline laid between two points to guide the diver during a search or to and from the workplace or to support and guide equipment for transport between two points.
 Lifting bags, an item of diving equipment consisting of a robust and air-tight bag with straps, which is used to lift heavy objects underwater by means of the bag's buoyancy when filled with air.
 A shot line, consisting of a weight, line and buoy, is used to mark the location and identify the ascent and descent point of a dive site, allowing divers to navigate to and from the surface and to do decompression stops at a safe location and to help control rate of ascent and descent.
 Decompression trapeze is used to assist in maintaining correct depth during in-water decompression stops.
 Diving bells and diving stages are used to transport divers from the surface to the underwater workplace.
 A downline is a line from the surface to underwater workplace used to control descent, ascent and the transfer of tools, materials and other equipment between the surface and the workplace. A weighted version suspended from the surface is used to control working depth when blue-water diving, It is similar in function to a jackstay, with an emphasis on the vertical dimension. The terms are largely interchangeable – a downline can be considered a predominantly vertical jackstay.

Surface support equipment connected with diving and underwater work

 Boarding ladders, particularly the Christmas tree ladder configuration, with a single central rail and cantilevered rungs on both sides, which allows a diver to climb while wearing fins.
 Breathing gas analysis equipment
 Dive platforms (or swim platforms) on boats.
 Diver down flag which is flown to warn others that divers are underwater in the vicinity
 Diver lifts, to conveniently transport a diver from the deck level into the water near the surface and back out in full equipment. 
 Diving air compressor to fill diving cylinders with high pressure air or other gasses
 Diving chambers for surface decompression and treatment of decompression illness
 Diving support vessels
 Dive boat
 Day boats, which may be rigid-hulled inflatable boats
 Live-aboard dive boat
 Dynamically positioned vessel
 Echo sounder, side-scan sonar and multi-beam sonar for location, depth measurement, and profiling of dive sites
 GPS receiver - for locating dive sites
 Surface-supplied diving breathing gas supply system, including:
 Low pressure breathing air compressors
 High pressure gas storage equipment
 Breathing gas distribution panels
 Diver's umbilicals
 Diver voice communications equipment
 Gas reclaim system for deep heliox diving
 Gas blending systems
 Gas blending systems for scuba diving
 Hot water systems for supply of heating water to divers wearing hot water suits
 Light and shape signals indicating underwater operations
 Marine VHF radio - for communicating with rescue services and other vessels
 Proton magnetometer - for locating ferrous wrecks
 Saturation systems providing surface support for saturation diving.

Special equipment for underwater work not carried by the diver
 Remotely operated underwater vehicle - for locating dive sites, observing the environment, conducting visual searches, monitoring divers or performing physical work. Mostly used in professional diving applications.

Maintenance
Life support equipment must be maintained and tested before use to ensure that it remains in serviceable condition and is fit for use at the time. Pre-dive inspection and testing of equipment at some level is standard procedure for all modes and applications of diving. The use of checklists is known to improve reliability of inspection and testing, and may be required by the applicable code of practice or operations manual, or manufacturer's operating instructions. Inadequate pre-dive checks of breathing apparatus can have fatal consequences for some equipment, such as rebreathers, or may require the diving operation to be aborted without achieving its objective.

Maintenance can be categorised as:
Planned periodical maintenance, such as annual service and inspection of breathing apparatus, pressure equipment, lifting gear and other items according to manufacturers' recommendations or legislation.
Cleaning and inspection after use, and appropriate storage. A large part of this is washing off salt water to prevent it from drying on the equipment and leaving corrosive brine or abrasive salt deposits, which can cause accelerated deterioration of some materials and jamming of moving parts. The ultraviolet component of sunlight can also damage non-metallic components and equipment, and ozone produced by electrical equipment is known to adversely affect some materials, such as the latex seals on dry suits. Most diving equipment will last better if stored in a cool, dry, well ventilated place out of direct sunlight.

Decontamination and disinfection

Diving equipment may be exposed to contamination in use and when this happens it must be decontaminated This is a particular issue for hazmat diving, but incidental contamination can occur in other environments. Personal diving equipment shared by more than one user requires disinfection before use. Shared use is common for expensive commercial diving equipment, and for rental recreational equipment, and some items such as demand valves, masks, helmets and snorkels which are worn over the face or held in the mouth are possible vectors for infection by a variety of pathogens. Diving suits are also likely to be contaminated, but less likely to transmit infection directly.

When disinfecting diving equipment it is necessary to consider the effectiveness of the disinfectant on the expected pathogens, and the possible adverse effects on the equipment. Some highly effective methods for disinfection can damage the equipment, or cause accelerated degradation of components due to incompatibility with materials.

Development, manufacture and marketing

History

 
With the partial exception of breath-hold diving, the development of underwater diving capacity, scope, and popularity, has been closely linked to available technology, and the physiological constraints of the underwater environment which the technology allows divers to partially overcome. The timeline of underwater diving technology is a chronological list of notable events in the history of the development of underwater diving equipment.

Standards
National and international standards have been published for the manufacture and testing of diving equipment.

Underwater breathing apparatus
  Respiratory equipment - Self-contained re-breathing diving apparatus
  Transportable gas cylinders. Periodic inspection and testing of seamless aluminium alloy gas cylinders
  Transportable gas cylinders. Periodic inspection and testing of seamless steel gas cylinders

Swim fins

  US Military specification. Swim fins, rubber.
  USSR/CIS standard, Ласты резиновые для плавания. Общие технические условия. Swimming rubber flippers. General specifications.
 DIN 7876:1980 German standard, Tauchzubehör. Schwimmflossen. Maße, Anforderungen und Prüfung. Diving accessories for skin divers. Flippers. Dimensions, requirements and testing.
 BN-82/8444-17.02 Polish Industry standard. Gumowy sprzęt pływacki - Płetwy pływackie (Rubber swimming equipment - Swimming fins).
  Malaysian standard, Specification for rubber swimming fins.
  Austrian standard, Tauch-Zubehör; Schwimmflossen; Abmessungen, sicherheitstechnische Anforderungen, Prüfung, Normkennzeichnung. Diving accessories; fins; dimensions, safety requirements, testing, marking of conformity.
  Malaysian standard, Specification for rubber swimming fins. First revision.
  European standard, Diving equipment. Diving open heel fins. Requirements and test methods.

Diving masks

  British standard, Specification for snorkels and face masks. Amended 1977.
  USSR/CIS standard, Маски резиновые для плавания под водой. Общие технические условие. Rubber masks for submarine swimming. General specifications.
  German standard, Tauch-Zubehör. Tauchbrillen. Sicherheitstechnische Anforderungen und Prüfung. Diving accessories for skin divers. Diver's masks. Requirements and testing.
  Polish Industry standard, Gumowy sprzęt pływacki - Maski pływackie (Rubber swimming equipment - Swimming masks).
  American National Standard, Underwater Safety. Recreational Skin and Scuba Diving. Lenses for Masks.
  Austrian standard, Tauch-Zubehör; Tauchmasken (Tauchbrillen); Sicherheitstechnische Anforderungen, Prüfung, Normkennzeichnung. Diving accessories; divers’ masks; safety requirements, testing, marking of conformity.
  Chinese National Standard, 潛水鏡. Diving mask.
  Chinese National Standard, 潛水鏡檢驗法. Method of test for diving mask.
  European standard, Diving equipment. Diving mask. Requirements and test methods.

Snorkels
  British standard, Specification for snorkels and face masks. Amended 1977.
  German standard, Tauch-Zubehör; Schnorchel; Maße, Anforderungen, Prüfung. Diving accessories for skin divers. Snorkel. Technical requirements of safety, testing. 
  Austrian standard, Tauch-Zubehör; Schnorchel; Abmessungen, sicherheitstechnische Anforderungen, Prüfung, Normkennzeichnung. Diving accessories; snorkels; dimensions, safety requirements, testing, marking of conformity.
  German standard, Tauch-Zubehör; Schnorchel; Sicherheitstechnische Anforderungen und Prüfung. Diving accessories for skin divers. Snorkel. Safety requirements and testing.
  European standard, Diving accessories. Snorkels. Safety requirements. 
  European standard, Diving equipment. Snorkels. Requirements and test methods.
Buoyancy compensators
 BN-82/8444-17.05 Polish Industry standard. Gumowy sprzęt pływacki - Kamizelki pływackie (Rubber swimming equipment - Swim vest).
  Diving accessories. Buoyancy compensators. Functional and safety requirements, test methods. 
  Diving equipment. Buoyancy compensators. Functional and safety requirements, test methods.
Wetsuits
  濕式潛水衣. Diving Wet Suit.
  Diving suits. Wet suits. Requirements and test methods.  Diving suits. Wet suits. Requirements and test methods.
Dry suits
  Diving suits. Dry suits. Requirements and test methods.  Diving suits. Dry suits. Requirements and test methods.
Depth gauges
  Diving accessories. Depth gauges and combined depth and time measuring devices. Functional and safety requirements, test methods.

References

External links